Shelby County Schools is the school district of Shelby County, Alabama. Its headquarters are in Columbiana.

Schools

High Schools (9-12):

Vincent Middle/High,
Shelby County High,
Oak Mountain,
Montevallo,
Chelsea,
Helena, &
Calera

Middle Schools (6-8):

Oak Mountain,
Columbiana,
Montevallo,
Chelsea,
Helena, &
Calera

Intermediate Schools:

Oak Mountain (4-5)
Helena (3-5)
Calera (4-5)

Elementary Schools:

Oak Mountain: K-3
Chelsea Park: K-5
Forest Oaks: K-5
Montevallo: K-5
Wilsonville: K-5
Inverness: K-3
Mt Laurel: K-5
Elvin Hill: K-5
Vincent: K-5
Helena: K-2
Calera: K-2

Special Needs School: Linda Nolen Learning Center (K-12)

Alternative School: New Direction

High schools
 Calera High School
 Chelsea High School
 Helena High School
 Montevallo High School
 Oak Mountain High School
 Shelby County High School
 Shelby County Career Technical Education Center
 Vincent High School

References

External links

 Shelby County Schools

School districts in Alabama
Schools
1856 establishments in Alabama
School districts established in 1856